Coalition of Imam's Line groups was an Iranian political alliance active in 1990s, consisting of Islamic radical leftist groups later emerging current reformists.

An ally of Association of Combatant Clerics, the coalition endorsed their list for the 1992 parliamentary election and issued its own list for 1996 elections.

Ideology 
Economically, the group opposed privatization and emphasized social justice, equal distribution of wealth, state control over economy using continuation of subsidy and rationing. In foreign policy, they supported export of the revolution, support of Islamic movements abroad and confrontation with the United States.

Member groups 
Members of the alliance were:
Mojahedin of the Islamic Revolution of Iran Organization
Islamic Association of Iranian Medical Society
Islamic Association of Engineers
Islamic Association of Teachers
Islamic Association of University Instructors
Office for Strengthening Unity

Non-member allies 
 Association of Combatant Clerics
 Executives of Construction Party

References

Defunct political party alliances in Iran
Electoral lists for Iranian legislative election, 1996
Far-left politics
Reformist political groups in Iran